András Bérczes (5 November 1909 – 30 May 1977) was a Hungarian footballer. He competed in the men's tournament at the 1936 Summer Olympics.

References

External links
 

1909 births
1977 deaths
Hungarian footballers
Olympic footballers of Hungary
Footballers at the 1936 Summer Olympics
Footballers from Burgenland
Association football forwards
Pécsi VSK footballers